The 2002 Victorian state election was held on 30 November 2002.

Retiring Members

Labor
Alex Andrianopoulos MLA (Mill Park)
Keith Hamilton MLA (Morwell)

Liberal
Robert Dean MLA (Berwick)
Rob Maclellan MLA (Pakenham)
John Richardson MLA (Forest Hill)
Ross Smith MLA (Glen Waverley)
Garry Spry MLA (Bellarine)
Mark Birrell MLC (East Yarra)
Bruce Chamberlain MLC (Western)
Geoff Craige MLC (Central Highlands)
John Ross MLC (Higinbotham)

National
Don Kilgour MLA (Shepparton)
Barry Steggall MLA (Swan Hill)
Ron Best MLC (North Western)
Roger Hallam MLC (Western)

Legislative Assembly
Sitting members are shown in bold text. Successful candidates are highlighted in the relevant colour. Where there is possible confusion, an asterisk (*) is also used.

Legislative Council
Sitting members are shown in bold text. Successful candidates are highlighted in the relevant colour. Where there is possible confusion, an asterisk (*) is also used.

See also
 Members of the Victorian Legislative Assembly, 2002-2006
 Members of the Victorian Legislative Council, 2002-2006
 2002 Victorian state election

References
Victorian Electoral Commission Official Results
Psephos - Adam Carr's Election Archive

Victoria
Candidates for Victorian state elections